Marianina is a genus of sea slugs, nudibranchs, shell-less marine gastropod molluscs in the family Tritoniidae.

Species
Two species are recognised in the genus Marianina:
 Marianina khaleesi (Silva, de Azevedo et Matthews-Cascon, 2014)
 Marianina rosea (Pruvot-Fol, 1930)

References

Tritoniidae
Gastropod genera